Bursting Out is a 1978 live double album by the rock band Jethro Tull. The concert was recorded at the Festhalle in Bern, Switzerland, on 28 May 1978 during the band's European Heavy Horses Tour in May/June of that year.

A spelling error on the spine of the first US, Canada, Spain and Sweden LP pressings listed the title as "Busting Out".

The album was originally released on vinyl, and was later re-released as a double-disc CD in the UK and Europe. The original CD release in the United States was only one disc, with three tracks ("Quatrain", "Sweet Dream" and "Conundrum") omitted to fit the 80 minutes running length. The double-disc 1990 CD version in the UK and Europe incorporated the first track, the introductions, in the song that followed. In 2004, the complete album was remastered and released worldwide as a two-disc set, with the introductions as separate tracks.

Track listing

Personnel
 Ian Anderson – vocals, flute, acoustic guitar
 Martin Barre – electric guitar, mandolin, marimba
 John Glascock – bass guitar, additional electric guitar
 John Evan – piano, organ, synthesizers, accordion
 Dee Palmer – portative organ, synthesizers
 Barriemore Barlow – drums, percussion, glockenspiel.

Charts

Certifications

References

External links
 
  (bonus tracks)
  (remastered)
 Progressive World Review
 1978 Jethro Tull concert schedule

1978 live albums
Jethro Tull (band) live albums
Chrysalis Records live albums
Albums produced by Ian Anderson